Siu yuk is a variety of siu mei, or roasted meat dishes, in Cantonese cuisine. It is made by roasting an entire pig with seasonings, such as salt and vinegar in a charcoal furnace at high temperature.
 Roasted pigs of high quality have crisp skin and juicy and tender meat. Usually the meat is served plain with its skin, but it is sometimes served with soy sauce or hoisin sauce.

Terminology
When individual pieces are served, it is known as "roasted meat". When the entire pig is served, the dish is known as "roasted pig". In most cases it is referred to by the former term since it is always consumed in small quantities.

Regional

Southern China

The southern Chinese style of cooking is nearly identical between the south parts of mainland China and Hong Kong. Sometimes, the entire pig is purchased for the sake of special family affairs, business openings, or as a ritualistic spiritual offering. For example, in the entertainment industry in Hong Kong, one tradition is to offer one or several whole roast pigs to the Jade Emperor to celebrate a film's opening with a roast pig; the pig is sacrificed to ward off negative reviews from critics in return to pray for the film's success. One garnish used to make the dish look more appealing is topping the roast pig with circular slices of pineapple and glacé cherries for eyes. The roast pig is often presented in red wrapping paper and a red box for luck.

Overseas Chinatowns
In many overseas Chinatowns, due to the majority of migrants outside of China coming from the south, the cooking style served in restaurants is almost identical to that found in Southern China.

See also

Char siu
Lechon
Pig roast
Siu mei
Suckling pig
Chicharrón

References

Cantonese cuisine
Hong Kong cuisine
Chinese pork dishes